The Faraway Tree is a series of popular novels for children by British author Enid Blyton. The titles in the series are The Enchanted Wood (1939), The Magic Faraway Tree (1943), The Folk of the Faraway Tree (1946) and Up the Faraway Tree (1951).

The stories take place in an enchanted wood in which a gigantic magical tree grows – the eponymous 'Faraway Tree'. The tree is so tall that its topmost branches reach into the clouds and it is wide enough to contain small houses carved into its trunk. The wood and the tree are discovered by three children who move into a house nearby. They befriend many of the residents and have adventures in magical lands that visit the top of the tree.

Books
The first title of the main trilogy, The Enchanted Wood, was published in 1939, although the Faraway Tree and Moon-Face had already made a brief appearance in 1936 in The Yellow Fairy Book. A picture-strip book, Up the Faraway Tree, was published in 1951. Over the years, the Faraway Tree stories have been illustrated by various artists including Dorothy M. Wheeler (first editions), Rene Cloke, Janet and Anne Grahame Johnstone, and Georgina Hargreaves.

The Enchanted Wood

In the first novel in the series, Jo, Bessie and Fanny (edited to Joe, Beth and Frannie in revised editions) move to live near a large forest, which the locals call "The Enchanted Wood". One day they go for a walk in the wood and discover it really is enchanted. They encounter a group of elves who have been robbed of important papers by a gnome. They chase the gnome and recover the papers, but the gnome himself escapes up a huge tree whose branches seem to reach into the clouds. This is the Faraway Tree.

Against the elves' advice, the children climb the Faraway Tree. They discover that it is inhabited by magical people, including Moon-Face, Silky the fairy, The Saucepan Man, Dame Washalot, Mr. Watzisname and the Angry Pixie, whose houses are carved into the trunk. They befriend some of these people, in particular Moon-Face and Silky. At the very top of the tree they discover a ladder which leads them to a magical land which is different on each visit, because each place moves on from the top of the tree to make way for a new land. The children are free to come and go, but they must leave before the land moves on, or they will be stuck there until that same land returns to the Faraway Tree. In various chapters, one of the children gets stuck in the land.

The lands at the top are sometimes extremely unpleasant – for example, the Land of Dame Slap (altered to Dame Snap in revised editions), an aggressive school teacher; and sometimes fantastically enjoyable - notably the Land of Birthdays, the Land of Goodies, the Land of Take-What-You-Want and the Land of Do-As-You-Please.

The first land the three children visit is the Roundabout Land, where they give some cake to two rabbits, and the rabbits dig a hole for themselves and the three children. After several more adventures, the people of the Faraway Tree need the children's help when they are invaded by an army of Red Goblins. The last land they visit in this book is the Land of Birthdays, where the brownies and the inhabitants of the Faraway Tree celebrate Bessie's birthday.

The Magic Faraway Tree
Dick (later Rick), the cousin of Jo, Bessie and Fanny, comes to stay and he joins the secret adventures in the lands of the Faraway Tree. Dick is not interested at first, but later on he becomes interested and gets into mischief. Together they venture into many new lands and have a lot of fun. For example, in the Land of Goodies, some houses are made of chocolate.

The Folk of the Faraway Tree
Connie, a spoilt and stuck-up girl, comes to stay for the summer with the three children while her mother is sick. At first, Connie refuses to believe in the Faraway Tree or the magical folk who live in it, even when the Angry Pixie throws ink at her and when Dame Washalot soaks her. When the children visit the lands at the top of the tree, Connie gets a few surprises. The Saucepan Man's mother decides to live in the tree, leaving her job as a baker in Dame Slap's land. She sets up a surprising cake shop in the tree.

Up the Faraway Tree
Unlike the first three books in the series, this work is not a novel, but a series of illustrations with short text underneath. The plot follows two new children, Robin and Joy, who have read The Enchanted Wood and want to join in the adventures. They go to the wood to meet Jo, Bessie and Fanny and meet some of the wood's residents, including Silky and Moon Face.

Characters
The main characters are Jo, Bessie and Fanny (updated in recent revisions to Joe, Beth and Frannie), who are three siblings. Fanny is the youngest, Bessie is next in age and Jo is their big brother. They live near the Enchanted Wood and are friends of the residents of the Faraway Tree. Other characters include:

 The Angry Pixie, who lives in a house with a tiny window and has a habit of throwing cold water or any liquid at hand over people who dare to peep inside;
 The barn owl, who lives in the house next to the Angry Pixie's. He is a friend of Silky's;
 Silky the fairy is so named because of her long, golden hair. She is one of the regular companions of the children when they go up the Tree to other worlds;
 Mr. Watzisname cannot remember his name. He sleeps and snores all the time. During a particular story at the Land of Secrets, Mr. Watzisname discovers his name, Kollamoolitumarellipawkyrollo, then forgets it almost immediately as it is so long;
 Dame Washalot, who spends her time washing her clothes and throwing the dirty wash-water down the tree. If she has no clothes to wash, she washes the dirty laundry of other people and even the leaves of the Faraway Tree;
 Moon-Face is so named for his round face that looks like the moon. His house is similarly round and is filled with curved furniture. He is the owner of the slippery-slip, a slide which starts in the middle of his house which lets you slide down to the bottom of the Faraway Tree instead of climbing down. It is used as a means of exiting the tree and has played an important part in some of the adventures, where others have sought control of the tree or their rooms;
 The Saucepan Man, who lives with Mr. Watzisname. His name stems from the fact that he is covered all over with saucepans and kettles. Sometimes, he cannot understand what his friends are saying because he is partially deaf, which is further aggravated by all the noise from the pans and kettles which he carries all the time. In the cartoon series, he looks very similar to Horace and Jasper from 1961 Disney film One Hundred and One Dalmatians. The Saucepan Man also appears in another lesser-known Blyton book, The Book of Brownies (aka Brownie Tales), helping the travellers out of one of their many bouts of trouble on their journey;
 The Saucepan Man's mother, who lives with Dame Washalot after The Folk of the Faraway Tree. She runs a cake shop;
 Dame Slap, who runs a school for bad pixies which, in some of the adventures, the friends accidentally land in. Her name has been updated in later revisions of the book to Dame Snap.

Updates
In modern reprints, the names of some of the characters have been changed. Jo has been changed to Joe, the more common spelling for males, and Bessie is now Beth, the former name having fallen out of usage as a nickname for Elizabeth. Fanny and Dick have been renamed Frannie and Rick because in the United Kingdom and some countries in the Commonwealth of Nations they are now more widely used as slang terms for genitalia.

The supporting character Dame Slap has also become Dame Snap, and no longer practises corporal punishment but instead reprimands her students by shouting at them.

Entire passages of the original have been rewritten to remove references to fighting. For instance, when the tree is taken over by Goblins in The Enchanted Wood, the Goblins were originally fought off, with descriptions of Mr. Watzisname 'pummelling them as if he were beating carpets' and the Saucepan Man throwing his saucepans at them. These have been replaced with cursory references to 'chasing'. Some of the changes were criticised in a review by Alison Flood.

Continuations by other authors

Silky's Story by Jeanne Willis, 2020.

Moonface's Story by Emily Lamm, 2021 (picture book).

The Magic Faraway Tree: A New Adventure by Jacqueline Wilson was published in May 2022.

Adaptations

Film
In October 2014, it was announced that the books will be adapted for the cinema for the first time and are being developed for a live action film version by Sam Mendes' production company, Neal Street Productions. , the film was still listed as being "in development."

Television
In 1997, stories from the novels were adapted into animated ten-minute episodes for the TV series Enid Blyton's Enchanted Lands. The series, entitled Enchanted Lands: The Magic of the Faraway Tree had 13 episodes:

1. The Land of Toys
2. The Land of Take What You Want
3. The Land of Dame Tickle
4. The Land of Ice And Snow
5. The Land of Dreams
6. The Land of Spells
7. The Land of Marvels
8. The Land of Know Alls
9. The Land of Secrets
10. The Land of Topsy Turvy
11. The Rocking Land
12. The Land of Wizards
13. The Land of Giants 

The voice cast were Roy Hudd, Richard Pearce, Kate Harbour, John Baddeley, Jimmy Hibbert, Janet James and David Holt.

References

Book series introduced in 1939
Enid Blyton series
Forests in fiction